Blue Pyramid may refer to:

 Blue Pyramid (The Gone Jackals album), 1998
 Blue Pyramid (Johnny Hodges and Wild Bill Davis album), 1966